Azizabad (also Romanized as ‘Azīzābād) is a village in Korond Rural District, in the Central District of Boshruyeh County, South Khorasan Province, Iran. At the 2006 census, its population was 64, in 22 families.

References 

Populated places in Boshruyeh County